This article lists the main target shooting events and their results for 2017.

World events

International Shooting Sport Federation
 August 30 – September 11: 2017 ISSF Junior World Championships held in Suhl and Moscow.
 August 30 – September 11: 2017 World Shotgun Championships held in Moscow, Russia

ISSF World Cup
 2017 ISSF World Cup
 2017 ISSF Junior World Cup

International Confederation of Fullbore Rifle Associations

International Practical Shooting Confederation
 June 4–11: 2017 IPSC Rifle World Shoot in Kubinka, Russia
 August 27 – September 3: 2017 IPSC Handgun World Shoot at the Centre National de Tir in Châteauroux, France

FITASC
2017 Results

Commonwealth Shooting Championships
 October 28 – November 8: 2017 Commonwealth Shooting Championships at the Belmont Shooting Complex in Brisbane, Australia. This was a test event ahead of the Shooting at the 2018 Commonwealth Games.

Island Games
 June 24–30: Shooting at the 2017 Island Games in Gotland, Sweden

2017 Islamic Solidarity Games
 May 13–17: Shooting at the 2017 Islamic Solidarity Games in Baku, Azerbaijan

Regional Events

Africa

Americas

Asia

Asian Shooting Championships
 December 6–12: 2017 Asian Airgun Championships in Wakō, Saitama, Japan
 August 3–14: 2017 Asian Shotgun Championships in Astana Kazakhstan

Southeast Asian Games
 August 21–26: Shooting at the 2017 Southeast Asian Games in Subang, Malaysia

Europe

European Shooting Confederation
 March 6–12: 2017 European 10 m Events Championships in Maribor, Slovenia
 July 21 – August 4: 2017 European Shooting Championships in Baku, Azerbaijan

2017 Games of the Small States of Europe
 May 30 – June 2: Shooting at the 2017 Games of the Small States of Europe held in San Marino

"B Matches"
 February 2–4: InterShoot in Den Haag, Netherlands
 December 13–16: RIAC held in Strassen, Luxembourg

National Events

United Kingdom

NRA Imperial Meeting
 July, held at the National Shooting Centre, Bisley
 Queen's Prize winner: 
 Grand Aggregate winner: CJ Watson
 Ashburton Shield winners: Wellington College, Berkshire
 Kolapore Winners: 
 National Trophy Winners: 
 Elcho Shield winners: 
 Vizianagram winners: House of Commons

NSRA National Meeting
 August, held at the National Shooting Centre, Bisley
 Earl Roberts British Prone Champion:

USA
 2017 NCAA Rifle Championships, won by West Virginia Mountaineers

References

 
2017 in sports
2017 sport-related lists